Citharichthys amblybregmatus is a species of flatfish in the large-tooth flounder family Paralichthyidae. It is native to the western north Atlantic Ocean.

It is a demersal fish. Like the rest of the large-tooth flounders, it has both eyes on the left side of its head. The species was described at the same time as the anglefin whiff. Both species display sexual dimorphism, with the males displaying several secondary sex characteristics, making both species similar to the previously described horned whiff (Citharichthys cornutus).

References

  (1970): Two New Species of the Flatfish Genus Citharichthys (Bothidae) from the Western North Atlantic Copeia 1970(2): 340-348

Citharichthys
Fish of the Atlantic Ocean
Fish described in 1970